In telecommunication, the term communications center has the following meanings: 

 An agency charged with the responsibility for handling and controlling communications traffic. The center normally includes a message center, and transmitting and receiving facilities.
 A facility that (a) serves as a node for a communications network, (b) is equipped for technical control and maintenance of the circuits originating, transiting, or terminating at the node, (c) may contain message-center facilities, and (d) may serve as a gateway.  Synonym comm center.

See also
Network operations center

References

Telecommunications buildings